José Velásquez (born 18 July 1970) is a Colombian former cyclist. He competed at the 1992 Summer Olympics and the 1996 Summer Olympics.

References

1970 births
Living people
Colombian male cyclists
Olympic cyclists of Colombia
Cyclists at the 1992 Summer Olympics
Cyclists at the 1996 Summer Olympics
Place of birth missing (living people)
20th-century Colombian people